Live in Houston 1981: The Escape Tour is a live DVD/CD package by the American rock band Journey, released on 15 November 2005. The content of the package was also released on 16 May 2006 as a separate CD and separate DVD on the Columbia Records label. It was released on 180-gram vinyl in 2022, in both black and colored versions.

The material of the show was recorded and filmed for the then-fledgling MTV network on Journey's Escape Tour on 6 November 1981 at The Summit in Houston, Texas, at the height of the band's commercial success.

Hits such as "Lights", "Lovin', Touchin', Squeezin'", "Wheel in the Sky", and "Any Way You Want It" are performed, along with tracks from Journey's then-current album Escape, like its title cut, "Open Arms", "Who's Crying Now" and "Don't Stop Believin'" .

Closing the CD, digital streaming purchases and vinyl versions of the concert is the track, "The Party's Over (Hopelessly in Love)" which was not on the DVD. Instead the DVD has bonus interviews with the band from 1981 and 1982 plus an album advertisement for Escape.

Footage from this DVD is used in the infomercial for the Time-Life Ultimate Rock Ballads CD set.

Track listing

Personnel
Band members
Steve Perry – lead vocals
Neal Schon	- lead guitar, background vocals
Jonathan Cain – keyboards, piano, rhythm guitar, background vocals
Ross Valory – bass guitar, background vocals
Steve Smith – drums, percussion

Production
Steve Perry — Producer [DVD and CD]
Michael Rubenstein — film producer
John Neal — film editor
Kevin Elson – live recording, engineer
Scott Gutierrez – engineer
Allen Sides – mixing
Bob Ludwig – mastering
John Kalodner – executive producer

References

Journey (band) video albums
Journey (band) live albums
Live soft rock albums
2005 live albums
2006 live albums
Live video albums
Columbia Records live albums
Columbia Records video albums